The Judo at the 2019 European Youth Summer Olympic Festival contests were held at the Heydar Aliyev Arena, Baku, Azerbaijan, from 24 to 27 July 2019.

Medalists
Source:

Boys

Girls

Mixed

Medal table

Participating nations
A total of 297 athletes from 40 nations competed in judo at the 2019 European Youth Summer Olympic Festival:

 (1)
 (8)
 (12)
 (12)
 (6)
 (5)
 (6)
 (5)
 (2)
 (7)
 (3)
 (6)
 (1)
 (3)
 (12)
 (12)
 (11)
 (10)
 (6)
 (8)
 (9)
 (12)
 (3)
 (8)
 (6)
 (7)
 (12)
 (1)
 (12)
 (8)
 (12)
 (12)
 (5)
 (6)
 (10)
 (8)
 (4)
 (4)
 (12)
 (10)

References

External links
 
 

2019 European Youth Summer Olympic Festival
European Youth Summer Olympic Festival
2019
European 2019, Youth